The 1935 International cricket season was from April 1935 to August 1935.

Season overview

June

South Africa in England

July

England in Netherlands

References

1935 in cricket